Dimitar Panayotov Shtilianov or Shtilyanov (born 17 July 1976) is boxer from Bulgaria.

He won a bronze medal at the 1999 World Amateur Boxing Championships in Houston, Texas. Two years later, at the 2001 World Amateur Boxing Championships, he won the silver medal in the Light Welterweight (– 63,5 kg) and won the gold medal at the 2002 European Amateur Boxing Championships.

Shtilianov represented for Bulgaria at the 2004 Summer Olympics in Athens, Greece. In February of that year he won the title at the 2004 European Amateur Boxing Championships in Pula, Croatia.

Olympic results 
Defeated Selçuk Aydın (Turkey) 20-11
Lost to Amir Khan (Great Britain) 21-37

References

1976 births
Living people
Olympic boxers of Bulgaria
Boxers at the 2004 Summer Olympics
Sportspeople from Sliven
Bulgarian male boxers
AIBA World Boxing Championships medalists
Light-welterweight boxers
Lightweight boxers